The mayor of Salem is the head of municipal government of Salem, Massachusetts. There was no mayor of Salem until its city charter was accepted on March 23, 1836, prior to which Salem was still incorporated as a town.

List

External links
Mayors of Salem

See also
 Timeline of Salem, Massachusetts

Salem